Extreme Job is a 2019 South Korean action comedy film directed by Lee Byeong-heon, starring Ryu Seung-ryong, Lee Hanee, Jin Seon-kyu, Lee Dong-hwi and Gong Myung. The film was released on January 23, 2019.

As of June 2022, Extreme Job is the highest-grossing film and the second most viewed film in South Korean film history.

Plot
After failing their latest mission, a group of young narcotics detectives led by squad chief Go is offered one last chance to save their career. They should carry out undercover surveillance of an international drug gang. Their stakeout location is a chicken restaurant. Things seem to work, but Ko is informed that the restaurant will soon go out of business. Ko and his colleagues decide to purchase the restaurant, still planning to use it for their undercover operation. However, a rib marinade they have to improvise for a sticky chicken becomes an instant hit, and their chicken restaurant becomes famous for its food.

Cast

Main

Ryu Seung-ryong as Squad chief Go
A determined but poorly performing cop. He is a dedicated worker who invests his retirement fund into the fried chicken business. Nicknamed the Zombie as he has survived 12 stab wounds.
Lee Hanee as Detective Jang
The team's not-always-efficient problem solver. Nicknamed Jang-Bak (from Ong Bak) due to having been a kickboxing (Muay Thai) champion previously. Has a love/hate relationship with Ma.
Lee Dong-hwi as Detective Young-ho
The team's determined goal-setter and the most serious member of the team. Rumored to have been ex-military and a member of the elite UD team with kills under his belt.
Jin Seon-kyu as Detective Ma
A financially unreliable cop with gambling tendencies. The key figure behind the success of the fried chicken restaurant. He uses his parents' rib marinade recipe for exquisite taste. Is a showboater and an overconfident cop. Was a member of the South Korean judo team in the past. Has a love/hate relationship with Detective Jang.
Gong Myung as Detective Jae-hoon
The enthusiastic, youngest team member and cheerleader. Extremely gullible and childish. Has extraordinary resilience to blows due to being a high school baseball star and enduring brickbats for years.

Supporting
Shin Ha-kyun as Lee Moo-bae
Oh Jung-se as Ted Chang
Han Joon-woo as Detective
Kim Eui-sung as Police superintendent
Song Young-kyu as Detective squad chief Choi
Heo Joon-suk as General manager Jung
Kim Ji-young as Squad chief Go's wife
Kim Jong-soo as Chicken restaurant owner
Lee Joong-ok as Hwan-dong
Jung Jae-kwang as Gungpyeong Port uniformed police
Yang Hyun-min as Hong Sang-pil
Shin Shin-ae 3rd floor aunt (special appearance)

Box office
By the second day since the release the film topped the box office by selling 720,000 tickets.

On January 25, 2019, just after three days after release, Extreme Job surpassed 1 million viewers. It set a record of exceeding 1 million views in the shortest period of time for a January comedy film in Korea. It also tied to the 2016 film Luck Key as the fastest comedy film to reach 1 million views.

Soon after, on January 26, 2019, the film reached a total of 2 million moviegoers and broke the record for the fastest comedy film to hit the 2 million mark in just four days. The previous record holders Miracle in Cell No. 7 and Miss Granny took six days to achieve that.

The film continued becoming a box office hit as it reached the 3.1 million mark in five days at a faster rate than previous films that reached 10 million moviegoers such as Veteran and The Thieves which took six days to achieve the 3 million milestones. The film also broke the January daily ticket sales record previously held by Along with the Gods: The Two Worlds with 916,652 admissions on January 1, 2018.

Topping the local box office for nine straight days since its January 23 release, the film surpassed 5 million admissions on February 1, way beyond its 2.3 million tickets break-even point.

After two weeks after its initial release on February 6, the film finally reached a grand domestic total of 10 million admissions, making it the 23rd film to pass the 10 million mark. It also becomes the second comedy film in six years to reach 10 million moviegoers after Miracle in Cell No. 7.

On February 10, just in 19 days Extreme Job became the highest-grossing Korean comedy film of all time by reaching 12,835,396 moviegoers setting a new record. The previous record was held by Miracle in Cell No. 7 which drew a total of 12,811,206 moviegoers during its run.

According to statistics released by the Korean Film Council on February 18, Extreme Job has set a new record for the second-most-watched film in Korea of all time, coming in at 14,536,378. It is now second place behind The Admiral: Roaring Currents which still reigns on top with 17.61 million moviegoers in total. It has also become the highest-grossing film of all time in South Korea (unadjusted).

It is currently projected to gross around $100–120 million by the end of its theatrical run.

Remakes
Chinese movie Lobster Cop (龍蝦刑警,Released in June 2018) and Korean movie 'Extreme Job' actually were developed in the same project called the "Korean-chinese story co-development project' that was a cooperation between Chinese and Korean companies, with the same script localized differently in their respective countries.

In April of 2019, it was reported that a Hollywood remake was being worked on, starring Kevin Hart.

Awards and nominations

References

External links

2019 action comedy films
South Korean action comedy films
2010s Korean-language films
Police detective films
CJ Entertainment films
Films set in Seoul
Films set in restaurants
Films about the illegal drug trade
2010s South Korean films